George Armstrong may refer to:

Politics and law
 George Robert Armstrong (1819–1896), American politician; mayor of Omaha, Nebraska
 George Armstrong (New Zealand politician) (1822–1905), Member of Parliament in Canterbury, New Zealand
 George W. Armstrong (1827–1877), American politician; first state treasurer of Minnesota
 George S. Armstrong (1867–1947), Canadian politician; mayor of Edmonton, Alberta
 George Armstrong (Manitoba politician) (1870–1956), Canadian politician and labour activist
 George C. Armstrong (1872–1950), American newspaper editor, businessman, and Illinois state senator
 George Thomas Armstrong (1881–1941), Canadian politician in Manitoba

Sports
 George Armstrong (cricketer) (1882–1956), Australian cricketer
 Mule Armstrong (George Isaac Armstrong, 1885–1954), American baseball player
 George Armstrong (baseball) (1924–1993), American baseball player
 George Armstrong (ice hockey) (1930–2021), Canadian ice hockey player
 George Armstrong (footballer) (1944–2000), English football player

Others
 George Armstrong (physician) (c. 1720–1789), English physician
 George Dod Armstrong (1813–1899), Presbyterian minister and writer
 George Armstrong (engineer) (1822–1901), English railway engineer
 George Frederick Armstrong (1842–1900), English professor of engineering
 George Johnson Armstrong (1902–1941), first British citizen to be executed under the Treachery Act 1940
 George Armstrong (actor) (born 1962), English actor

See also

 George Armstrong Custer (1839–1876), United States Army officer and cavalry commander in the American Civil War and the Indian Wars
 
 Armstrong (disambiguation)
 George (disambiguation)